Staraya Shlyapina is a rural locality (a village) in Oshibskoye Rural Settlement, Kudymkarsky District, Perm Krai, Russia. The population was 82 as of 2010.

Geography 
Staraya Shlyapina is located 44 km northeast of Kudymkar (the district's administrative centre) by road. Novaya Shlyapina is the nearest rural locality.

References 

Rural localities in Kudymkarsky District